Alaotra-Mangoro is a region in eastern Madagascar. It borders Sofia Region in north, Analanjirofo in northeast, Atsinanana in east, Vakinankaratra in southwest, Analamanga in west and Betsiboka in northwest. The capital of the region is Ambatondrazaka, and the population was 1,255,514 in 2018.

Administrative divisions
Alaotra-Mangoro Region is divided into five districts, which are sub-divided into 82 communes.

 Ambatondrazaka District - 20 communes
 Amparafaravola District - 21 communes
 Andilamena District - 8 communes
 Anosibe An'ala District - 11 communes
 Moramanga District - 22 communes

Population
The region is mainly populated by the Sihanaka in the north, and the Bezanozano in the south. 
Other minorities are present, notably the Merina.

Economy

Agriculture
With 120.000 ha of planted surface, the region constitutes the main rice basin of Madagascar.
Other crops cover manioc (175.000 tonnes), potatoes (49.000 tonnes), corn (50.000 tonnes) and sugar cane (50.000 tonnes). 
Livestock (Zebu) reaches 265.000 heads and fishing 2000-2500 tons per year.

Mining
There is an important nickel mine near Moramanga/Ampitambe: the Ambatovy mine.
Other mining activities are found in Andilamena, Ambatondrazaka and Didy where sapphire and ruby are mined.

Transport

National Roads
Route nationale 2 (Antananarivo - Moramanga - Toamasina).
Route nationale 44 (Moramanga - Ambatondrazaka - Imerimandroso - Amboavory).

Railways
TCE (Tananarive-Côte Est) railway - (Toamasina - Moramanga - Antananarivo).
MLA (Moramanga-Lac Alaotra) railway (Moramanga - Ambatondrazaka).

Airports
Ambatondrazaka Airport
Amparafaravola Airport
Ambohijanahary Airport

Protected areas
 Torotorofotsy New Protected Area
 Part of Ankeniheny-Zahamena Corridor
 Lake Alaotra
 Maromizaha
 Ambatofotsy New Protected Area
 Ampananganandehibe-Behasina New Protected Area
 Ampotaka Ankorabe New Protected Area
 Analabe Betanatanana New Protected Area
 Analalava New Protected Area
 Mahialambo New Protected Area
 Mangabe-Ranomena-Sahasarotra New Protected Area
 Ambohidray New Protected Area
 Part of Zahamena National Park
Mantadia National Park
Analamazaotra National Park
Part of Marotandrano Reserve
Peyrieras Reptile Reserve (a butterfly farm and reptile center) at Marozevo

Rivers
Ivondro River
Marimbona
Sahamaitso
Sahatandra
Sandrangato
Vohitra River

References

 
Regions of Madagascar